Issikiopteryx taipingensis is a moth in the family Lecithoceridae that is endemic to Taiwan.

References

External links

Moths described in 2003
Endemic fauna of Taiwan
Insects of Taiwan
Issikiopteryx